Foraker is a town in Osage County, Oklahoma, United States. It was named for Ohio Senator Joseph B. Foraker. The Tallgrass Prairie Preserve is southeast of town. The official population peaked at 415 in 1910 and has declined steadily since 1930. The population was only 18 at the 2010 census, a 21.7 percent decline from 23 in 2000.

Foraker is now considered a ghost town. A historian quoted one long-time resident as saying: "Stores gone, post office gone, train gone, school gone, oil gone, boys and girls gone – only thing not gone is graveyard and it git bigger."

History
Located in an area of rolling plains and tallgrass prairie, a post office was established at Foraker on February 13, 1903. The town began as a 160-acre tract platted by the U.S. Department of the Interior along the Midland Valley Railroad in 1905. By 1909, the town had a population of 500 as the area underwent a ranching and farming boom. Foraker had the amenities associated with older communities: sidewalks, a public park, and plans for an electric and water system and a substantial school building.

The agriculture boom subsided, but the town was briefly revitalized by discovery of the Burbank Oil Field in 1920, which made Foraker an oil industry equipment supply center. In 1922 the Osage Railway, one of the Muskogee Roads, was opened from Foraker to Shidler, ten miles away, making Foraker an oil shipping point. The population rose to about 2,000 in the early 1920s. The Osage County oil boom declined during the Great Depression, and with it Foraker's fortunes. The population dropped. The Osage Valley railroad was abandoned in 1953 and the Midland Valley Railroad was abandoned in 1968. The town business district fell vacant. Foraker is now in a region dominated by large cattle ranches. A lonely and picturesque old cemetery in the prairie approximately one mile east of what remains of the town is the chief landmark.
The nearest post office is at Shidler.

Geography

Demographics

As of the census of 2000, there were 23 people, 10 households, and 6 families residing in the town. There were 13 housing units at an average density of 59.1 per square mile (22.8/km2). The racial makeup of the town was 73.91% White, 4.35% Native American, and 21.74% from two or more races. Hispanic or Latino of any race were 4.35% of the population.

There were 10 households, out of which 30.0% had children under the age of 18 living with them, 60.0% were married couples living together, and 40.0% were non-families. 40.0% of all households were made up of individuals, and 20.0% had someone living alone who was 65 years of age or older. The average household size was 2.30 and the average family size was 3.17.

In the town, the population was spread out, with 26.1% under the age of 18, 4.3% from 18 to 24, 30.4% from 25 to 44, 13.0% from 45 to 64, and 26.1% who were 65 years of age or older. The median age was 40 years. For every 100 females, there were 91.7 males. For every 100 females age 18 and over, there were 88.9 males.

The median income for a household in the town was $36,250, and the median income for a family was $63,333. Males had a median income of $38,750 versus $18,750 for females. The per capita income for the town was $20,079. None of the population and none of the families were below the poverty line.

Notable people
As a child the singer Patti Page (born Clara Ann Fowler) lived with her family for a time on Maple St. in Foraker.

Rodeo champion and Oscar-winning actor Ben Johnson (The Last Picture Show) was born and raised on his family's ranch near Foraker.

References

External links
 Morris,  John Wesley. "Foraker." In: Ghost Towns of Oklahoma. 1977. University of Oklahoma Press. 

Towns in Osage County, Oklahoma
Towns in Oklahoma